WYCS (91.5 MHz) is a non-commercial FM radio station licensed to Yorktown, Virginia, and serving the Peninsula of Hampton Roads. WYCS is part of the "Oasis Radio Network" and is owned and operated by David Ingles Ministries, Inc.

On weekdays, WYCS offers a schedule of Christian talk and teaching programs, middays and overnight. Early mornings, afternoons, evenings and weekends, WYCS plays Southern Gospel and Traditional Worship Music.

History
WYCS first signed on the air in February 1966.  It was owned by the York County School Board and offered educational programs and training for students interested in careers in broadcasting. The call sign stands for York County Schools.

It was later sold to David Ingles Ministries, Inc. The station became part of the Oasis Radio Network, based in Tulsa, Oklahoma.

References

External links
 91.5 FM the Oasis Network Online
 

Radio stations established in 1966
1966 establishments in Virginia
YCS
York County, Virginia
Southern Gospel radio stations in the United States